HVAC.com is an Indian Land, South Carolina, United States -based website. It is provides information to consumers on HVAC topics.

References

External links
 Company website

Heating, ventilation, and air conditioning